Volgograd Sports Palace of Trade Unions is an indoor sporting arena that is located in Volgograd, Russia. The arena can be used to host basketball, handball, futsal, ice hockey, martial arts, concerts and shows, and dancing.

The seating capacity of the arena is 3,700 for basketball games. It was the home arena of the Russian basketball team Krasny Oktyabr of the VTB United League.

References

External links
Venue information

Basketball venues in Russia
Indoor arenas in Russia
Indoor ice hockey venues in Russia
Sport in Volgograd